Transfer Trachea Reverberations from Point: False Omniscient is the debut album from Canadian mathcore band The End. The album was first released on Re-define Records in 2001, and was re-released on Relapse Records a year later.

Track listing
 "Her (Inamorata)" – 2:43
 "Opalescence.I" – 2:38
 "Opalescence.II" – 2:52
 "The Asphyxiation of Lisa-Claire" – 4:16
 "For Mankind, Limited Renewal" – 2:00
 "Sonnet" – 3:54
 "Entirety in Infancy" – 3:42

References

The End (Canadian band) albums
2002 debut albums
Relapse Records albums